

Seeds

  Tamarine Tanasugarn /  Varatchaya Wongteanchai
 Riza Zalameda /  Teart Conard

Draw

Women's Doubles